Marcel Renaud may refer to:

Marcel Renaud (cyclist) (1900–1968), French Olympic cyclist
Marcel Renaud (canoeist) (1926–2016), his nephew, French Olympic sprint canoer